Namuslu is a 1984 Turkish drama film directed by Ertem Eğilmez.

Cast
Şener Şen - Ali Rıza Öğün
Adile Naşit - Mother in law
Ayşen Gruda - Naciye
Erdal Özyağcılar - Mustafa
 - Manager
  - Müdür Necati
  - Ergün
  - Remzi
  - Çayci Hüseyin
 Bilge Zobu - Müteahhit

References

External links 

1984 drama films
1984 films
Turkish comedy-drama films